Miguel Neto Faria Neves (born 19 April 1988) is a Portuguese football player who plays for Fátima.

Club career
He made his professional debut in the Segunda Liga for Fátima on 17 February 2008 in a game against Feirense.

References

1988 births
Sportspeople from Coimbra
Living people
Portuguese footballers
C.D. Fátima players
Liga Portugal 2 players
Association football midfielders